Doab is a term used in South Asia for the tract of land lying between two confluent rivers.  It is similar to an interfluve.  In the Oxford Hindi-English Dictionary, R. S. McGregor defines it as from Persian do-āb (literally "two [bodies] of water") "a region lying between and reaching to the confluence of two rivers.

Khadir, bangar, barani, nali and bagar

Since North India and Pakistan are coursed by a multiplicity of Himalayan rivers that divide the plains into doabs (i.e. regions between two rivers), the Indo-Gangetic plains consist of alternating regions of river, khadir and bangar. The regions of the doabs  near the rivers consist of low-lying, floodplains, but usually, very fertile khadir and the higher-lying land away from the rivers consist of bangar, less prone to flooding but also less fertile on average.

Khadir is also called nali or naili, specially in northern Haryana the fertile prairie tract between the Ghaggar river and the southern limits of the Saraswati channel depression in that gets flooded during the rains.

Within bangar area, the barani is any low rain area where the rain-fed dry farming is practiced, which nowadays are dependent on the tubewells for irrigation. Bagar tract, an example of barani land, is the dry sandy tract of land on the border of Rajasthan state adjoining the states of Haryana and Punjab. Nahri is any canal-irrigated land, for example, the Rangoi tract which is an area irrigated by the Rangoi channel/canal made for the purpose of carrying flood waters of Ghagghar river to dry areas.

Historically, villages in the doabs have been officially classified as khadir, khadir-bangar (i.e. mixed) or bangar for many centuries, and different agricultural tax rates applied based on a tiered land-productivity scale.

The Doab

The Doab designates the flat alluvial tract between the Ganges and Yamuna rivers extending from the Sivalik Hills to the two rivers' confluence at Prayagraj. It is also called as Ganges-Yamuna Doab or Ganga Doab.

The British raj divided the Doab into three administrative districts, viz., Upper Doab (Meerut), Middle Doab (Agra) and Lower Doab (Prayagraj).

Currently the following states and districts form part of The Doab:

Upper Doab
Uttarakhand:
Dehradun and Haridwar

Uttar Pradesh:
Saharanpur, Shamli, Muzaffarnagar, Baghpat, Meerut, Ghaziabad, Hapur, Gautam Buddh Nagar and Bulandshahr

Delhi

Central or Middle Doab
Etah, Kasganj, Aligarh, Agra, Hathras, Firozabad, Mainpuri and Mathura is in the trans-Yamuna region of Braj.

Lower Doab
Farrukhabad, Kannauj, Etawah, Auraiya, Kanpur (Urban & Rural), Fatehpur, Kaushambi and Allahabad.

The Punjab Doabs

Each of the tracts of land lying between the confluent rivers of the Punjab region of Pakistan and India has a distinct name, said to have been coined by Raja Todar Mal, a minister of the Mughal emperor Akbar. The names (except for "Indus Sagar") are a combination of the first letters, in the Persian alphabet, of the names of the rivers that bound the Doab. For example, "Chaj" =  Chanāb ("Chenab") + Jehlam ("Jhelum"). The names are from east to west.

Indus Sagar Doab

The Indus Sagar Doab lies between the Indus and Jhelum rivers.

Chaj Doabs

The Chaj Doab lies between the Jhelum and the Chenab rivers.

Rachna Doabs

The Rachna Doab (considerable portion of the Rechna Doab is Majha) lies between the Chenab and the Ravi rivers.

Bari Doabs

The Bari Doab (considerable portion of the Bari Doab is Majha) lies between the Ravi, Beas and Sutlej rivers.

Bist Doab

The Bist Doab (or Doaba) - between the Beas and the Sutlej rivers.

Other doabs

Raichur Doab

The Raichur Doab is the triangular region of Andhra Pradesh and Karnataka states which lies between the Krishna River and it's tributary the Tungabhadra River, named for the town of Raichur.

See also
 Interamnia, an ancient Latin placename, meaning "between rivers"

Notes

References

Doabs of Punjab, Pakistan
Geography of Haryana
Geography of Madhya Pradesh
Geography of Punjab, India
Geography of Punjab, Pakistan
Geography of Rajasthan
Geography of Uttar Pradesh
Regions of Haryana
Regions of Madhya Pradesh
Regions of Punjab, India
Regions of Punjab, Pakistan
Regions of Rajasthan
Regions of Uttar Pradesh
Persian words and phrases
Natural regions of Asia